Rangiya railway division is one of the five railway divisions under Northeast Frontier Railway zone of Indian Railways. This railway division was formed on 1 April 2003 from Alipurduar railway division and its headquarter is located at Rangiya in the state of Assam of India.

Katihar railway division, Lumding railway division, Tinsukia railway division and Alipurduar railway division are the other four railway divisions under NFR Zone headquartered at Maligaon, Guwahati.

List of railway stations and towns 
The list includes the stations  under the Rangiya railway division and their station category.

References

 
Divisions of Indian Railways
2003 establishments in Assam